Arthur Blake may refer to:

 Arthur Blake (actor) (1914–1985), American actor
 Arthur Blake (English actor) (1929–2001), English actor
 Arthur Blake (hurdler) (born 1966), American hurdler
 Arthur Blake (distance runner) (1872–1944), American middle-distance runner
 Arthur Blake (Royal Navy officer) (1917–1940), British flying ace of the Second World War
 Blind Blake (Arthur Blake, 1896–1934), American blues/ragtime singer and guitarist

See also
 Henry Arthur Blake (1840–1918), British colonial administrator, governor of Hong Kong